Tommy McClennan (January 4, 1905 – May 9, 1961) was an American Delta blues singer and guitarist.

Life and career
McClennan was born in Durant, Mississippi, and grew up in the town. He played and sang blues in a rough, energetic style.

He made a series of recordings for Bluebird Records from 1939 through 1942. He regularly played with his friend Robert Petway. His voice is heard in the background on Petway's recording of "Boogie Woogie Woman" (1942). McClennan's singles in this period included "Bottle It Up and Go", "New Highway No. 51", "Shake 'Em on Down", and "Whiskey Head Woman".

Several of his songs have been covered by other musicians, including "Cross Cut Saw Blues" (covered by Albert King) and "My Baby's Gone" (Moon Mullican). McClennan's "I'm a Guitar King" was included in the 1959 collection The Country Blues, issued by Folkways Records.

McClennan died of bronchopneumonia in Chicago, Illinois, on May 9, 1961.

Citation
"He had a different style of playing a guitar", Big Bill Broonzy said. "You just make the chords and change when you feel like changing"

John Fahey's "Screaming and Hollerin' the Blues" contains an interview with Booker Miller, a contemporary of Charlie Patton's, in which Miller mentioned someone who is most likely Tommy McClennan, though Miller did not know his name: "... and I saw another fella he put some records out, they (him and Willie Brown) be together, but he be by himself when I see him, they called him "Sugar"... I ain't never known him as nothing but Sugar, he put out a record called Bottle Up and Go... I sold him my guitar."

Bob Dylan covered Tommy McClennan's track, "Highway 51" (which was written by Curtis Jones), on his self-titled debut album in 1962.

See also
List of Delta blues musicians
List of people from Mississippi

References

External links
 Tommy McClennan on yazoo.org - with photograph of McClennan
 Article on cascadeblues.com
 Illustrated Tommy McClennan discography

1905 births
1961 deaths
Delta blues musicians
Country blues musicians
American blues singers
American blues guitarists
American male guitarists
Blues musicians from Mississippi
Bluebird Records artists
People from Yazoo City, Mississippi
20th-century American guitarists
Guitarists from Mississippi
People from Durant, Mississippi
African-American guitarists
20th-century African-American male singers